Rareș Orzața (born 16 February 1977) is a Romanian gymnast. He finished eleventh in the all around at the 2000 Summer Olympics.

References

External links
 

1977 births
Living people
Romanian male artistic gymnasts
Olympic gymnasts of Romania
Gymnasts at the 2000 Summer Olympics
Sportspeople from Brașov